"Djäpana", subtitled Sunset Dreaming, is an 1989 song by Australian musical group Yothu Yindi.

History
The song was first released in August 1989 as the second and final single from the group's debut album, Homeland Movement.

The song was re-recorded and re-released in April 1992, following the success of "Treaty" in 1991. The re-release saw the song peak at number 13 on the ARIA Singles Chart and was certified gold.

Awards
At the ARIA Music Awards of 1993 the song won three awards; ARIA Award for Best Indigenous Release, ARIA Award for Best Video (Stephen Johnson) and ARIA Award for Engineer of the Year (Greg Henderson).

Track listing
7" single
 "Djapana (Sunset Dreaming)"	
 "Gunumarra – Seq 1"
 "Gunumarra – Seq 2"

 CD single/ 12" single
 "Djäpana (Sunset Dreaming)" (Gapirri Mix) – 3:59
 "Dhum Dhum (Bush Wallaby)"	
 "Djäpana (Sunset Dreaming)" – 3:43

 UK CD single
 "Djäpana (Sunset Dreaming)" (Gapirri Mix) – 3:59
 "Treaty (Filthy Lucre Remix)" – 6:51
 "Dhum Dhum" (Bush Wallaby) – 1:05
 "Matjala" (Driftwood)	– 5:23

 US 12" single
 "Djäpana" (Gapirri Mix) – 7:46
 "Djäpana" (A Capella Mix) – 3:37
 "Djäpana" (Babylon Mix) – 6:05
 "Djäpana" (Discoridub Mix) – 4:30
 "Djäpana" (Chic Clip Dub) – 3:54

Charts and certifications

Weekly charts

Year-end charts

Certifications

Release history

References

1989 songs
1992 singles
1989 singles
ARIA Award-winning songs
Yothu Yindi songs
Mushroom Records singles
Yolngu-language songs